Yirrkala moorei is an eel in the family Ophichthidae (worm/snake eels). It was described by John E. McCosker in 2006. It is a marine, tropical eel which is known from the western central Pacific Ocean, including Marquesas and American Samoa.

The species epithet "moorei" refers to Gordon E. Moore.

References

Ophichthidae
Fish described in 2006